The Glendy Burk is an American folk song by Stephen Foster. It appears in James Buckley's New Banjo Book published in 1860. The Glendy Burk of the song is a paddle steamer plying the Mississippi River basin. The boat was named for Glendy Burke: the 29th mayor of New Orleans.

Lyrics

References

American folk songs
Songs written by Stephen Foster
1860 songs
Blackface minstrel songs